The Presentation of the Virgin Mary Holy Metropolitan Church is a Greek Orthodox cathedral, located in Athinagora Square in the old town of Chania in Crete .It was originally built during the late period of Ottoman rule, between 1850 and 1860.

The church contains three aisles, of which the central aisle is dedicated to the Presentation of the Virgin, the south aisle to the Three Hierarchs and the north aisle to Saint Nicholas.

In the church are icons by well-known Cretan icon painters of the 19th century, such as Antonios Revelakis, Antonios Vivilakis, E. Triolitakis and Ioannis Stais. Some in the iconostasis have silver covers made by local goldsmiths. Above the iconostasis of the central nave are frescos of SS Peter and Paul by the painter Kokotsis.

In the dome above the sanctuary is the fresco of "She who is Wider than the Heavens" depicting the Virgin Mary and painted by Nikos Giannakakis.

An epigram written in Greek on the pediment of the front wall reads "Ye who walk here see the church of the Mother of God, built by faithful children of the Church finding refuge like frightened birds in the middle of a storm under the wing of the heavenly protecting veil".

History

According to historical accounts there was a small church on the spot from the early 11th century. The original small church was demolished by the Venetians, who built a warehouse in its place. When the Turks conquered Crete in 1695 they converted the warehouse into a soap factory, which continued operating until 1850.

The building was then donated by the Turkish authorities to the Chania Christian community, who converted it into a church, which was inaugurated by the Bishop of Kydonia in 1861. An icon salvaged from the original church, which had been housed in the Church of the Holy Unmercenaries, was transferred to the new church where it is still preserved in the narthex (or lobby area). The north aisle dedicated to Saint Nicholas replaced the Dominican church of St Nicholas in the Splantzia part of the town which the Turks had converted to a mosque. Following the building of the bishop's house, the church became the cathedral of what was then the capital of Crete.

The cathedral was damaged in the Greco-Turkish war of 1897 but restored at the expense of the Tsar of Russia, who also donated the cathedral's bell.

By royal decree in October, 1947 the feast of the Presentation of the Virgin (November 21) became the official feast day of Chania. A later decree in 1956 made it a bank holiday.

References

Greek Orthodox cathedrals in Greece
Buildings and structures in Chania
Churches in Crete
Churches completed in the 1850s
19th-century churches in Greece